Ankita is a Sanskrit word meaning "Marked". As with any adjective in the language, it can take on a nominal form. The word is often used as a female name in Asian countries, typically because of its extended meaning as "one with auspicious signs "engraving".

Notable people named Ankita 
 Ankita Bhakat (born June 17, 1998), Indian recurve archer.
 Ankita Bhambri (born October 28, 1986), Indian former professional tennis player.
 Ankita Lokhande (born December 19, 1981), Indian actress.
 Ankita Makwana (born May 29, 1987), Swiss-Indian actress, model, producer, speaker and writer.
 Ankita Bhargava Patel (born August 17, 1984), Indian television actress.
 Ankita Raina (born January 11, 1993), Indian professional tennis player.
 Ankita Mayank Sharma (born February 7, 1987), Indian model and television actress.
 Ankita Shorey (born October 3, 1992), Indian model and Femina Miss India International 2011 contest winner.
 Indian feminine given names